is a railway station in the town of Higashiura, Chita District, Aichi Prefecture, Japan, operated by Central Japan Railway Company (JR Tōkai).

Lines
Owari-Morioka Station is served by the Taketoyo Line, and is located 1.2 kilometers from the starting point of the line at Ōbu Station.

Station layout
The station has one side platform serving a single bi-directional track. The station has automated ticket machines, TOICA automated turnstiles and is unattended. There is no station building.

Adjacent stations

|-
!colspan=5|Central Japan Railway Company

Station history
Owari-Morioka Station was opened on December 7, 1933 as a passenger station on the Japanese Government Railways (JGR). The station was closed on November 11, 1944 and reopened on April 15, 1957 as a station on the Japan National Railway (JNR). With the privatization and dissolution of the JNR on April 1, 1987, the station came under the control of the  Central Japan Railway Company. Automatic turnstiles were installed in May 1992, and the TOICA system of magnetic fare cards was implemented in November 2006.

Station numbering was introduced to the Taketoyo Line in March 2018; Owari-Morioka Station was assigned station number CE01.

Passenger statistics
In fiscal 2017, the station was used by an average of 608 passengers daily (boarding passengers only).

Surrounding area
Kaien-ji
Owari Chita Agricultural Cooperative Morioka Office

See also
 List of Railway Stations in Japan

References

External links

Railway stations in Japan opened in 1933
Railway stations in Aichi Prefecture
Taketoyo Line
Stations of Central Japan Railway Company
Higashiura, Aichi